Jatin Sahay Saxena (born 4 August 1982) is an Indian first-class cricketer who plays for Chhattisgarh. He previously played for Madhya Pradesh. In January 2018, he was bought by the Rajasthan Royals in the 2018 IPL auction.

References

External links
 

1982 births
Living people
Indian cricketers
Madhya Pradesh cricketers
Cricketers from Indore
Kala Bagan Cricket Academy cricketers
Rajasthan Royals cricketers